"Stand" is a song written by Danny Orton and Blair Daly and recorded by American country music group Rascal Flatts.  It was released in January 2007 as the fourth and final single from their album Me and My Gang.  The song became their seventh number-one hit on Hot Country Songs chart on the week of May 12, 2007.

Content
"Stand" is a country song with a theme of having to overcome obstacles in life.

Critical reception
Kevin John Coyne, reviewing the song for Country Universe, gave it a D rating. He summed up his review by saying to "remove all remaining charm and originality from the lyric, drain all life and energy from the production, and add the most pathetically wimpy lead vocal imaginable, and you have this single."

Personnel
From Me and My Gang liner notes.
 Tim Akers - keyboards
 Tom Bukovac - guitars
 Eric Darken - percussion
 Jay DeMarcus - bass guitar
 Dann Huff - guitars
 Charlie Judge - keyboards
 Gary LeVox - lead vocals
 Chris McHugh - drums
 Joe Don Rooney - guitars
 Jonathan Yudkin - fiddle, mandolin

Chart performance

Year-end charts

References 

2007 singles
2006 songs
Rascal Flatts songs
Music videos directed by Shaun Silva
Song recordings produced by Dann Huff
Songs written by Blair Daly
Lyric Street Records singles
Country ballads
Songs written by Danny Orton